St John Clerkenwell is a former parish church in Clerkenwell, London, its original priory church site retains a crypt and has been given over to the London chapel of the modern Order of St John. It is a square, light-brick resurrection of the small church of Clerkenwell Priory – the crypt of which is beneath – without a spire or tower. Its three centuries of former decline reflected the disbandment of the medieval Order of St John, or Knights Hospitaller.

Sites

Buildings and garden of remembrance of the Order of St John of Jerusalem
A chapel, crypt beneath, garden of remembrance and narrow Georgian entrance building alongside, are owned by the order's eventual successor, the Order of Saint John (chartered 1888), which fundraises for and supports St John Ambulance.

St John's Gardens, Benjamin Street
A small public park or garden is a block south-west, beyond the Order's Museum and other small retail outlets and professional offices.  This replaced the Victorian enlarged edition of the church.

History

Queen Anne church
The crumbling structure was purchased and conserved by early 18th century London's partly successful Commission for Building Fifty New Churches.

Victorian restoration and conservation
The church was lightly restored and improved by a Mr. Griffith in 1845. In 1878 one of the large painted windows at the east end survived, as did remains of Prior Thomas Docwra's church in the south and east walls, and capitals and rib mouldings of the former church underpinned the pews. In 1868 its living was a rectory valued £260, in the patronage of the lord chancellor.

Redundancy of the parish church and wartime bombing of the old and new buildings
In 1931, because of falling attendances, the parish was united with that of St James, Clerkenwell, and St John's ceased to be a parish church. The original site here was handed over to the worldwide Order of Saint John (chartered 1888) to be its main English chapel, which it remains.

The larger, successor Victorian church one block away, 150 metres to the south-west, was largely gutted by bombing in 1941 as was this site.

Reconstruction of the old chapel
This replacement chapel for the Order was rebuilt from 1951 to 1958 by the architects John Seely and Paul Paget. The crypt of the medieval building survives in the present structure.

The outline of the round church consecrated in 1185 is marked out in St John's Square in front of the church; to the south of the church is the Garden of Remembrance that occupies the site of a 16th-century chapel.

Bibliography

References

External links
GENUKI
 History of Islington - has several pages on the church and priory
  - 'Archives in London' has more detail

History of the London Borough of Islington
Clerkenwell
Buildings and structures in Clerkenwell
Clerkenwell